Nazluchay Rural District is in Nazlu District of Urmia County, West Azerbaijan province, Iran. At the National Census of 2006, its population was 10,624 in 2,104 households. There were 14,455 inhabitants in 2,690 households at the following census of 2011. At the most recent census of 2016, the population of the rural district was 13,727 in 2,803 households. The largest of its 34 villages was Qaralar-e Tasuji, with 2,844 people.

References 

Urmia County

Rural Districts of West Azerbaijan Province

Populated places in West Azerbaijan Province

Populated places in Urmia County